Sleepy Hollow is an American supernatural drama television series that premiered on Fox on September 16, 2013 and ended on March 31, 2017. The series is considered a "modern-day retelling" of the 1820 short story "The Legend of Sleepy Hollow" by Washington Irving with added concepts from "Rip Van Winkle", also by Irving. The series was renewed for a fourth and final season which premiered on January 6, 2017.

During the course of the series, 62 episodes of Sleepy Hollow aired over four seasons.

Series overview

Episodes

Season 1 (2013–14)

Season 2 (2014–15)

Season 3 (2015–16)

Season 4 (2017)

Ratings

References

External links
 
 

Lists of American horror-supernatural television series episodes